The Bekok railway station is a Malaysian train station located at and named after the town of Bekok, Segamat District, Johor. This railway station provides KTM Intercity train services.

See also
 Rail transport in Malaysia

External links
 Bekok KTM Railway Station

KTM ETS railway stations
Segamat District
Railway stations in Johor